Tooting Bec Hospital was a mental facility in Tooting Bec, London, England.

History
This facility was one of the establishments commissioned by the Metropolitan Asylums Board to deal with chronic cases. The hospital, which was designed by Arthur and Christopher Harston using a dual pavilion layout, opened as the Tooting Bec Asylum in January 1903. It became Tooting Bec Mental Hospital in 1924 and, after suffering some bomb damage during the Second World War, it joined the National Health Service as Tooting Bec Hospital in 1948. After the introduction of Care in the Community in the early 1980s, the hospital went into a period of decline and closed in July 1995. The buildings were subsequently demolished and the site redeveloped by Fairview Homes for residential use as "Heritage Park".

References

Hospital buildings completed in 1903
Hospitals established in 1903
1903 establishments in England
1995 disestablishments in England
Hospitals disestablished in 1995
Defunct hospitals in London
Former psychiatric hospitals in England